Nevarez or Nevárez is a surname. Notable people with the surname include:

Angel Nevarez, American artist
Francisco Nevarez (born 2000), Mexican footballer
Gloria Nevarez, American sports executive
Hilda Anderson Nevárez (1938–2011), Mexican trade union leader and politician
Micaela Nevárez (born 1972), Puerto Rican actress 
Pedro Ávila Nevárez (born 1937), Mexican politician
Poncho Nevárez (born 1972), American politician